Home is the third album of the Filipino band 6cyclemind, released by Musiko Records & Sony BMG Music Entertainment (Philippines), Inc. on January 27, 2007. Having all cover tracks, the album released 3 singles: "Prinsesa", "Upside Down"  and "Dinamayan".

Track listing

Album credits
Executive Producer: Rudy Y. Tee
Executive A&R: Vic Valenciano
All songs arranged by 6cyclemind & Wendell Garcia
All songs performed by 6cyclemind
Produced by Wendell Garcia
Engineered by Angee Rozul & Mark Villena of Tracks Studios
Strings by Bobby Velasco on \"In Between Days\"
Violin by Maricor Reyes on \"Be My Number Two\"
Piano by Isha Abubakar on \"Be My Number Two\"
Album cover concept, design and photography by John Ed de Vera

References

6cyclemind albums
2007 albums
Covers albums